Demon Seed is a fixed shooter written by Jeffrey Sorensen and Philip MacKenzie for the TRS-80 and published in 1982 by Trend Software. The same programmers developed the TRS-80 Color Computer version published in 1983 by Computer Shack. Demon Seed is a clone of the 1980 arcade game Phoenix.

Gameplay
Demon Seed is a game in which the player uses artillery against rows of attacking birds.

Reception
Dick McGrath reviewed the game for Computer Gaming World, and stated that "Although the concept is not original, it is well executed, with fine graphics and interesting sound. I rate it a 7 out of 10 overall."

References

External links
Review in 80 Micro
Review in The Rainbow
Review in Creative Computing
80-U.S.
Review in Color Computer Magazine

1982 video games
Dragon 32 games
Fixed shooters
TRS-80 Color Computer games
TRS-80 games
Video game clones
Video games developed in the United States
Video games set in outer space